Diana (Διάνα) is the brand name for agricultural machinery produced by Irene Chrissadakou A.E. a company located in Tavros (Athens), Greece. Founded in 1976, it is one of the most successful light tractor manufacturers in Greece, also managing to survive the crisis in Greek manufacturing industry of the 1980s and 1990s. Diana has produced a wide range of machinery and accessories. Between 1979 and 1984 it developed and produced a type of light truck in "open" and "closed" cab versions, 18 hp Ruggerini Diesel engine, max speed 67 km/h, 1 ton payload and cross-country capability, using the chassis of the Chevrolet 3100, as well as a number of light tractor models.

References 

 L.S. Skartsis, "Encyclopedia of Greek vehicles and aircraft", Achaikes Ekdoseis/Typorama, Patras, Greece (1995) 
L.S. Skartsis, "Greek Vehicle & Machine Manufacturers 1800 to present: A Pictorial History", Marathon (2012)  (eBook)

External links 
 Company website

Agricultural machinery manufacturers of Greece
Tractor manufacturers of Greece
Truck manufacturers of Greece
Motor vehicle manufacturers of Greece
Greek brands
Companies of Greece